Américas–Avenida Boyacá, formerly Mundo Aventura, is part of the TransMilenio mass-transit system of Bogotá, Colombia, which opened in the year 2000.

Location

The station is located in southwestern Bogotá, specifically on Avenida de Las Américas with Transversal 71C.

It serves the Marsella and Techo neighborhoods, the Clinica de Occidente, and the Plaza de las Américas shopping center.

History
In 2003, the Las Américas line was extended from Distrito Grafiti to Transversal 86, including this station.

The station was named Mundo Aventura after the amusement park located nearby and joined by a foot and bike path along Transversal 71 D.

This station has a Punto de Encuentro or meeting point, which has bathrooms, coffeeshop, parking for bicycles and a tourist attention booth.

Station services

Old trunk services

Main line service

Complementary routes

This station does have connections to Complementary routes.

Inter-city service

This station does not have inter-city service.

See also
 Bogotá
 TransMilenio
 List of TransMilenio Stations

External links
TransMilenio

TransMilenio